Gullu Haji Naim Mustafa gizi Mustafayeva (November 29, 1919 — May 18, 1994) was an Azerbaijani artist, People's Artist of Azerbaijan.

Biography 
Gullu Mustafayeva was born on November 29, 1919, in Charjuy. She was originally from Shamakhi. In 1927 she moved with her family from Turkmenia to Baku, Old City.

Gullu Mustafayeva graduated from Azerbaijan State Art College in 1938. Gullu Mustafayeva created portraits of labor heroes, figures of science and art of her time. Some of these are the portraits of the two-time Hero of Socialist Labor Basti Bagirova, ophthalmologist, doctor of medical sciences Umnisa Musabayova, neurologist, doctor of medical sciences Zahra Salayeva, people's artist Sattar Bahlulzade.

In Gullu Mustafayeva's works, children's portraits form a special series ("Our children" series). The portrait "Mahsati Ganjavi" created in 1947 has a special place in the artist's work. Her works are kept in National Art Museum of Azerbaijan and Azerbaijan State Art Gallery.

G. Mustafayeva died on May 18, 1994, in Baku.

References 

Azerbaijani women painters
20th-century Azerbaijani painters
1919 births
1994 deaths
Soviet painters